NarNarayan Dev Yuvak Mandal (NNDYM) (Devnagari: नरनरायन देव युवक मनदल) was founded by Koshalendraprasad Pande (then pre-acharya) in 1994 with its headquarters at the Kalupur Swaminarayan Mandir (Ahmedabad) and was created to help young people to confront the challenges of life.   

This step set into motion various initiatives by this organization to build a foundation of young people around the globe. The organisation propagates dharma (duty), bhakti (devotion), gnaan (knowledge), and vairagya (detachment from maya).

Aims
 Participate in humanitarian efforts
 Seek cultural awareness
 Welcome guidance through personal spiritual development

Activities

Cultural
 bal mandal classes
 traditional Garba dance festival (during Navratri) 
 volunteer services at the time of big festivals

Spiritual
 NNDYM international camps 
 regional conferences 
 monthly NNDYM satsang sabhas

Social
 young men and women's combined conferences 
 ISSO-NNDYM sports day
NNDYM Fun Camp

Publications
 Divo/Insight
The goal stated for the InSight website is "to provide a forum for youths to discuss life in the western world while trying to balance and understand the philosophies of the Swaminarayan Sampraday", with an emphasis on humanity in addition to religiousness. It emphasizes understanding of the Swaminarayan Sampraday, the Nar Narayan Dev Gadi, under the acharya Koshalendraprasadji and Param Pujya, Lalji Maharaj 108 Shree Vrajendraprasadji Maharaj.

Satsangi youths provide content and the online platform allows readers to comment, discuss, and explore a Satsangi community.

See also

 Swaminarayan
 Swaminarayan Sampraday
 ISSO (Swaminarayan)
 Swaminarayan Museum

References

 Introduction to Narnarayan Dev Yuvak Mandal

Swaminarayan Sampradaya